MTX Mototrax is a racing video game developed by Left Field Productions and published by Activision for PlayStation 2 and Xbox in 2004. It was released for Microsoft Windows and Mac OS X later that year developed by Beenox and published by Aspyr. It was also released in 2006 for the PlayStation Portable. Additional releases were planned for the GameCube console in 2004, which was later canceled, and Tapwave Zodiac, which was called off when Tapwave went out of business. A demo version of the game is available in the options menu in the PlayStation 2 version of Tony Hawk's Underground.

The game was developed in partnership with motocross rider Travis Pastrana, who lent his name and image to the game via its box art. It was originally titled Travis Pastrana's Pro MotoX before being renamed MTX: Mototrax featuring Travis Pastrana and eventually settling on its final name.

MTX Mototrax features many of the top AMA Supercross/Motocross racers and X Games freestylers of that time (2004), including Nate Adams, Kenny Bartram, Carey Hart, Chad Reed, Tim Ferry, Mike Brown, Ezra Lusk, among others. The first level in career mode is held at Pastrana's house.

Reception

The game received "generally favorable reviews" on all platforms except the PSP version, which received "average" reviews, according to video game review aggregator Metacritic.

References

External links
 
 

2004 video games
Aspyr games
Beenox games
Cancelled GameCube games
Left Field Productions games
MacOS games
Multiplayer and single-player video games
PlayStation 2 games
PlayStation Portable games
Video games developed in the United States
Windows games
Xbox games